The Kingdom of Parbat was a petty kingdom in the confederation of 24 states known as Chaubisi Rajya. Parbat was one of the powerful kingdom in the 24 principalities.

References 

Chaubisi Rajya
Parbat
Parbat
History of Nepal
Parbat